The  is the 1st edition of the Japan Film Professional Awards. It awarded the best of 1991 in film. The ceremony took place on March 13, 1992, at Shinjuku Cine Pathos in Tokyo.

Awards 
Best Film: Manatsu no Chikyū
Best Director: Osamu Murakami (Manatsu no Chikyū)
Best Actress: Tomoko Nakajima (Dance till Tomorrow)
Best Actor: Masahiro Motoki (Asobi no Jikan wa Owaranai)
Best New Director: Sadaaki Haginiwa (Asobi no Jikan wa Owaranai)
Special: Shozin Fukui (964 Pinocchio)

10 best films
 Manatsu no Chikyū (Osamu Murakami)
 Asobi no Jikan wa Owaranai (Sadaaki Haginiwa)
 Dance till Tomorrow (Itsumichi Isomura)
 Skinless Night (Rokurō Mochizuki)
 Misty (Toshiharu Ikeda)
 World Apartment Horror (Katsuhiro Otomo)
 Roujin Z (Hiroyuki Kitakubo)
 964 Pinocchio (Shozin Fukui)
 Hiruko the Goblin (Shinya Tsukamoto)
 Zeiram (Keita Amemiya)

References

External links
  

Japan Film Professional Awards
1992 in Japanese cinema
Japan Film Professional Awards
March 1992 events in Asia